The Toyota T series is a family of inline-4 automobile engines manufactured by Toyota beginning in 1970 and ending in 1985. It started as a pushrod overhead valve (OHV) design and later performance oriented twin cam (DOHC) variants were added to the lineup. Toyota had built its solid reputation on the reliability of these engines.

The 4T-GTE variant of this engine allowed Toyota to compete in the World Rally Championship in the early 1980s, making it the first Japanese manufacturer to do so.

Race engines based on the 2T-G include the 100E and 151E.

All T engines utilize a timing chain and have a cast iron block with an alloy cylinder head with hardened valve seats and a hemispherical combustion chamber design (HEMI).
All T engines are carburetted except those with electronic fuel injection, "E" designation.
All T engines use a 2 valve OHV design except those with a DOHC performance head, "G" designation.
The 12T/13T has a sub-cylinder directly behind the spark plug that leads into a smaller chamber for emission purposes.



Features overview

T

The first T engine displaced  and was produced from 1970 through 1979.

From 1977 there was also a T-J, a version with some simple emissions equipment intended for Japanese market commercial vehicles.

The T-U also appeared in 1977 with even stricter emission equipment for Japanese market non-commercial vehicles.

Applications:
 1970–1977 Toyota Carina TA10/15/16V (first generation)
 1977–1979 Toyota Carina Van TA16V (second generation, T-J)
 Toyota Celica TA20
 Toyota Corolla TE20/25
 Toyota Corolla TE30/35/50
 Toyota Sprinter TE40/50

2T

The larger  2T was produced from 1970 through 1984.

The 2T engines are usually coupled with either a T40 4 speed/T50 5 speed manual transmission, or an A40 3 speed automatic transmission.

Applications:
 Toyota Corolla E20 to E30 series
 Toyota Carina A10 to A60 series
 Toyota Celica A20 to A60 series
 Toyota Corona TT100/106V/110
 Toyota Corona TT130/137V
 Toyota Corona TT140
 Daihatsu Charmant
 Toyota TownAce TR10V (2T-J)
 Daihatsu Delta Wide TB10

The 1979 championship was won by a Toyota 2T powered Cheetah mk6. In 1984 Peter Glover borrowed a Cheetah mk7 powered by Toyota 2T for one round. The car won the round and helped secure the championship.

12T

The  12T and 12T-U (lean burn) was produced from 1970 through 1983. There was also a 12T-J version for commercial vehicles, which didn't have to meet as stringent emissions standards in Japan. In response to Honda's CVCC emissions, Toyota introduced "TTC-L", using a lean burn implementation.

Applications:
 Toyota Corolla TE52
 Aug 1979–Aug 1981 Toyota Corolla Van TE73 (12T-J)
 Aug 1981–Aug 1983 Toyota Corolla Van TE74 (12T-J)
 Mar 1976–Jul 1977 Toyota Carina TA31-A
 Aug 1977–Aug 1981 Toyota Carina TA41-A
 Aug 1979–Aug 1981 Toyota Carina Van TA49V-A (12T-J)
 Aug 1977–Jun 1981 Toyota Celica TA41-B
 Jan 1980–Feb 1982 Toyota Celica Camry TA41-C
 Aug 1977–Sep 1978 Toyota Corona TT120
 Sep 1978–Dec 1981 Toyota Corona TT130
 Dec 1979–Dec 1981 Toyota Corona Van TT138 (12T-J)
 Jan 1982–Oct 1983 Toyota Corona Van TT147 (12T-J)
 Toyota Sprinter TE66
 Toyota TownAce Wagon TR11G
 Apr 1978–Sep 1981 Daihatsu Charmant A40
 Daihatsu Delta Wide Wagon TB11G

2T-G

The 2T-G, produced from 1970 through 1983, is a chain driven 8v DOHC version. Variants include the air-injected 2T-GR, Japan-spec 2T-GU, and fuel injected 2T-GEU. Twin sidedraft  Mikuni-Solex PHH carburetors were used in non EFI versions. All 2T-G cylinder heads were cast by Yamaha, however, some are not marked as such.

The 2T-G was replaced by the 4A-GE in most applications.

Applications:
 Toyota Corolla Levin/Sprinter Trueno E20 through E70 series
 Toyota Celica A20 through A60 series
 Toyota Carina A10 through A60 series

Like the 2.0 L 18R-G, the 2T-G was considered the flagship engine of Toyota's 1600 class until it was superseded by the 4A-GE in the 1980s. The 2T-G is still a popular engine for conversions to classic Celicas and Corollas and are often suitable for classic and formula racing series.

Aftermarket pistons are available from very low (<7.0:1) through to very high (>13.0:1) compression ratios. Racing 2T-G engines ("NOVA") featured  bore and stroke for a  displacement. This engine was used in Formula 3 cars in both Europe and Japan (where it dominated), as well as in Formula Pacific (FP).

3T

The 3T displaces  and was produced from 1973 through 1985. The 3T-U was originally compliant with Japan's 1976 emissions standards (TTC-C), from October 1977 it used Toyota's lean burn system called TGP ("Turbulence Generating Pot") in order to pass the 1978 emissions standards.

The 3T OHV engines are mated to either of a T40 4-speed, T50 5-speed manual transmission, or an A40 3-speed, or A40D 4-speed automatic transmission.

Applications:
 1978–1981 Toyota Carina TA47 (also TA57 in Japan)
 Toyota Carina TA60 series
 Toyota Corolla TE72
 Aug 1973–Jan 1977 Toyota Corona TT121
 Toyota Corona TT130 series
 Toyota Corona TT141
 Toyota Celica A60 series
 Toyota Celica Camry TA50 series
 Toyota Mark II/Chaser TX30 series

13T

The  13T-U was produced from 1977 through 1982.

Applications:
 Aug 1979–Aug 1981 Toyota Corolla TE70 (Japan only) 
 Aug 1979–Aug 1981 Toyota Sprinter TE70 (Japan only)
 Toyota Celica A40 series
 Jan 1980– ? Toyota Celica Camry TA46
 Toyota TownAce TR15
 Toyota TownAce Truck TM20
 Jul 1977–Sep 1978 Toyota Corona TT126
 Mar 1980–Aug 1982 Toyota Cresta TX50
 Toyota Chaser and Toyota Mark II TX60
 Daihatsu Delta Wide Wagon TB15G (TownAce)

3T-GTE

The 3T-GTE, first released in September 1982, is the most performance oriented version of the  3T engine. It features a hemi chambered 8v twin-cam head with twin-spark (two spark plugs per cylinder) design and swirl inlet ports for better efficiency. The EFI system saw the introduction of knock control. This was the first turbocharged twin-cam engine built in Japan. Units built after May 1983 received a water cooled turbocharger. The engine was considerably over-engineered for durability, for instance featuring doubled cam roller chains, as it was also to form the basis for the 4T-GT competition engines. It either came mated to a W55 5speed manual with a larger  clutch and lighter  flywheel or an A43D 4-speed automatic transmission.

Applications:
 Sept 1982–Jul 1985 Toyota Celica TA63
 Sept 1982–Jul 1985 Toyota Carina TA63
 Jan 1982–Aug 1985 Toyota Corona TT142
3T-GTE powered vehicles are badged as GT-T or GT-TR.

4T-GTE

This is the version of the T family which powered Toyota's Group B and World Rally Championship cars. The homologation engine, introduced in November 1982, features a  increase in bore over the 3T, giving . With a multiplication factor of 1.4 for turbocharged engines, this equalled  in the eyes of the FIA, placing the Celica in the  class.

The 1984 Group B rally version produced  at 8,000 rpm. The road going homologation version (4T-GTEU, 200 built) produces . The total build number, including modified versions, was 228.

Applications:
 Oct 1982–Aug 1983 Toyota Celica Twincam Turbo GT-TS TA64
 Toyota Celica "IMSA GTO"
 Toyota Supra JGTC
 Toyota 83C
 Toyota 84C
 Toyota 85C
 Toyota 86C
 Eagle Mk I

Race engines
The '151E' engine used 4 valves per cylinder.

The '100E' engine used twin spark plugs with 2 valves per cylinder but was used mainly by a Toyota works team.

Italy Nova Corporation produced a 2.0 L engine based on the 2T-G that was used in most of the world F3 cars for a long time.

See also

 List of Toyota engines
 T-G Tech Notes

External links

 Toyota 3TC Corolla Site
 Toyota Corolla Levin 2T-G Corolla Site

References

Toyota engines
Straight-four engines
Gasoline engines by model